AFM Ruhal Haque (born 11 February 1944) is a Bangladesh Awami League politician and the former Minister of Health and Family Welfare.

Early life 
Haque graduated with an MBBS and work as a doctor.

Career 
Haque was elected to Parliament in 2008 and 2014 from Satkhira-3 as a Bangladesh Awami League candidate. He was made the president Swadhinata Chikitshak Parishad, a pro-Awami League doctors association, by Prime Minister Sheikh Hasina. He served as the Minister of Health and Family Welfare.

References

Living people
1944 births
People from Satkhira District
Awami League politicians
Health and Family Welfare ministers of Bangladesh
9th Jatiya Sangsad members
10th Jatiya Sangsad members
11th Jatiya Sangsad members